The Red Rovers, commonly referred to as the Alabama Red Rovers, was a military volunteer company organized in Courtland, Alabama to support the Texas Revolution. Raised by doctor and planter Jack Shackelford in November 1835, the unit took its name from the red jeans of their uniforms and was outfitted with equipment from Alabama state arsenal. Consisting of some 70 men, nearly half the men in Courtland, the unit remained encamped until December 12 before setting out for Texas by way of New Orleans. After arriving at Lavaca Bay on January 19, 1836, and being accepted into Texas service on February 3, the Red Rovers were put under command of Colonel James W. Fannin. They fought in the Battle of Coleto on March 19–20, performing well, but the Texians were overrun and ultimately forced to surrender

Mexican president Antonio López de Santa Anna had ordered General José de Urrea to treat the rebels and their supporters as pirates and to have them executed as such. As a result, the majority of the Red Rovers, including two of Shackelford's sons, were killed in the Goliad massacre on March 27, 1836, along with hundreds of others. Shackelford himself was spared execution since his skills as a doctor could be used to treat Mexican soldiers. He would ultimately be released and return to Alabama, where he was thought dead, and given a hero's welcome. Four of the men, Zachariah S. Brooks, Dillard Cooper, Isaac D. Hamilton, and Wilson Simpson, escaped the slaughter. The four men traveled together at night to avoid capture and eventually found their way to other Texas forces and safety.

References

American filibusters (military)